Hasina Mannan is a Bangladesh Awami League politician and the former Member of Bangladesh Parliament from a reserved seat.

Early life
Mannan was born 15 October 1947.

Career
Mannan was elected to parliament from reserved seat as a Bangladesh Awami League candidate in 2009.

References

Awami League politicians
Living people
1947 births
Women members of the Jatiya Sangsad
9th Jatiya Sangsad members
21st-century Bangladeshi women politicians
21st-century Bangladeshi politicians